The Centre national du cinéma et de l'image animée (CNC;  the National Centre for Cinema and the Moving Image) is an agency of the French Ministry of Culture, and is responsible for the production and promotion of cinematic and audiovisual arts in France. The CNC is a publicly owned establishment, with legal and financial autonomy.

Created by law on 25 October 1946 as the Centre national de la cinématographie (National Centre for Cinematography), it is currently directed by Frédérique Bredin.

The CNC archives are located in the former Fort de Bois-d'Arcy to the southwest of Paris. Initially established in 1969 to house combustible nitrate films, the archives now house modern acetate films as well.

Functions
The principal functions of the CNC are:

Regulation of cinema
Support of the economy of the cinema, audiovisual, and multimedia arts
Promotion of cinema and audiovisual arts among the public
Protection of French cinematographic heritage

List of presidents
 Michel Fourré-Cormeray (1945–1952)
 Jacques Flaud (1952–1959)
 Michel Fourré-Cormeray (1959–1965)
 André Holleaux (1965–1969)
 André Astoux (1969–1973)
 Pierre Viot (1973–1984)
 Jérôme Clément (1984–1989)
 Dominique Wallon (1989–1995)
 Marc Tessier (1995–1999)
 Jean-Pierre Hoss (1999–2001)
 David Kessler (2001–2004)
 Catherine Colonna (2004–2005)
 Véronique Cayla (2005–2010)
 Éric Garandeau (2011–2013)
 Frédérique Bredin (2013-2019) 
 Olivier Henrard (July 2019 - interim)
 Dominique Boutonnat (July 2019 - current )

See also

Institut national de l'audiovisuel
Europa Cinemas
French video game policy

References

External links 
 Official French site of the Centre national du cinéma et de l'image animée
 French archives of CNC movies
The site of AFF-CNC puts online a part their movie database conserved in Bois-d'Arcy. It gives as well the necessary information to consult these movies, either at Bois-d'Arcy or in their chanal in BnF, and offers online accreditation formulas. In other parts, the website offers courses of themes to make it possible to discover the activities and the missions of theses archives.

Film organizations in France
Film production companies of France
Government agencies established in 1946
French film industry
Government agencies of France
1946 establishments in France
Film archives in France